Ak-Shor is a village in Aravan District of Osh Region of Kyrgyzstan established in 1968. Its population was 3,129 in 2021.

References

Populated places in Osh Region